The R365 is a Regional Route in South Africa that connects Piketberg and Lamberts Bay.

Its north-western terminus is at the R364 in Lamberts Bay. From there it heads south then east for 29 kilometres to reach  Leipoldtville. It continues for a further 57 kilometres in a south-easterly to south-south-easterly direction before crossing the Kruismans River and meeting the R366 at a T-junction from the south. Here, turning right, the westerly route is signed as the R366 to Elands Bay. The R365 turns left here, continuing east before veering south. After 13 kilometres, a turnoff to the left is given to Eendekuil. Continuing south, it ends at a four-way junction with the R44 at Piketberg. The R365 enters from the north, with the south and west roads unsigned. The easterly road is the westerly terminus of the R44.

The turnoff to the Dasklip Pass is located along the R365 just outside of Porterville.

External links
 Routes Travel Info

References

Regional Routes in the Western Cape